Gavin Martin (10 December 1961 – 10 March 2022) was a Northern Irish music journalist.

Life and career
Born in Bangor, County Down, he had his first writings on music published in the NME in his early teens, before founding the punk fanzine Alternative Ulster in 1977 and writing about local bands such as Stiff Little Fingers and The Undertones.  He moved to London in late 1979, and became a features writer and later media editor for the NME.  In a lengthy career writing for the magazine, he interviewed and wrote features on many of the leading musicians of the period, including U2 (whose first feature article he wrote), Van Morrison (with whom he had a love-hate relationship), Marvin Gaye, Neil Young, Madonna, Leonard Cohen, and many more.

In the 1990s, he contributed to many newspapers and magazines, including The Times, The Guardian, Vox, and Uncut.  He became the music critic for the Daily Mirror in 2001.  In 2009, he worked with journalist Suzanne Moore on a TV series based on Pete Frame's Rock Family Trees.

He lived in St Leonards-on-Sea, Sussex, and died at the age of 60, while on holiday in Barbados.

References

1961 births
2022 deaths
British music journalists
People from Bangor, County Down